The National Collegiate Athletic Association football championship is held every early part of the year (January).

The football season is divided into two conferences (tournaments). Out of the eight NCAA schools, only four fields a team in the football tournament.

The teams face each other once every conference. The teams with the most points on the league table advances in the Championship game.

If a team wins both conferences, the Championship game is omitted, and the winning team from both conferences is the champion.

Champions

Number of championships by school

Notes:
 LSGH won nine (9) titles as a junior to DLSU (1969–1981) and thirteen (13) titles as a junior to CSB (1998–present).

References

See also
UAAP Football Championship

Football competitions in the Philippines
Football (Soccer)